Rizwana "Riz" Lateef is a British journalist, newsreader and deputy news manager at the BBC. She is the principal presenter for the regional television news service for London, BBC London.

Early life
Lateef was born in London. Her family are from Pakistan. She was educated at Westminster Business School and attended the University of Westminster where she graduated with an MBA.

Career
Lateef presents the BBC London News 18:30 bulletin from Monday to Thursday and some editions of the 22:30 programme. She also used to present the now-defunct Friday edition of the National 20:00 Summary on BBC One.

She joined BBC London in 2003 as a reporter and occasional newsreader. Following the departure of Emily Maitlis in March 2006 to present on BBC News 24, Riz was promoted to present the flagship 6.30pm BBC London News programme on BBC One. She was also the main anchor for the BBC London News Podcast, presented by BBC as a trial.

Previously, she reported for BBC Breakfast and presented regional news for the BBC in the North East & Cumbria. Lateef was also a guest presenter on BBC One's Holiday programme in 2003 and 2004. She also presented relief shifts on BBC News 24 in 2006. She is one of the main relief presenters for the BBC Weekend News on BBC One and the BBC News Channel.

Recognition and key achievements
Winner of the Asian Women of Achievement Awards 2009: Riz Lateef won the award for Media Professional for her work on BBC London News being one of the key figures in the coverage of the 2008 mayoral elections.
She has been named as one of London's '1,000 most Influential People' by the Evening Standard.

References

External links
 BBC London - Riz Lateef
 

BBC newsreaders and journalists
Living people
English people of Pakistani descent
Alumni of the University of Westminster
Year of birth missing (living people)